Seamus Leydon is a former Gaelic footballer who played with his local club Dunmore MacHales and was a vital member of the Galway three-in-a-row team of the 1960s.

Biography

Schools & Minor
1960 started with success for Leydon in the Hogan Cup All-Ireland Schools Football Championship with a 3-10 to 3-7 victory for St Jarlath's College over St Finian's College. Among Seamus' teammates on the Jarleth's team were future Galway teammates Johnny Geraghty, Enda Colleran and Pat Donnellan.  

The success continued in 1960 as a star studded Galway Minor team won Connacht and All-Ireland honours beating Cork 4-9 to 1-5 in a one sided All-Ireland final.

Senior
In 1961 Leydon made his inter-county Galway debut at Senior level and quickly established himself on the team. Backboned by the 1959 and 1960 minor teams - eight of whom made it through to Senior level - Galway were a coming force. They were defeated by Dublin in the 1963 All-Ireland final however the Corrib-siders were not to be denied and between 1964 and 1966 they famously achieved the three-in-a-row beating Kerry in 1964 All-Ireland final and 1965 All-Ireland final and then Meath in 1966 All-Ireland final. 

Leydon enjoyed further success with Galway winning Connacht titles in 1968, 1970 and 1971. Galway made it back to the 1971 All-Ireland final losing out to Offaly.

At the time when the Railway Cup was a popular competition, Leydon was a regular on the Connacht team from 1964 to 1972. He played on both of Connacht's wins in 1967 and 1969.

Club
At club level, Leydon was a central figure in the Dunmore MacHales team that emerged to dominate Galway football during the 1960s. Dubbed the Kings of the Sixties, Dunmore won five Galway Senior Football Championship titles in 1961, 63, 66, 68 (captained by Leydon) and 69. Among Seamus' teammates on the Dunmore team were Galway teammates John Keenan, Tommy Keenan, Bosco McDermott, John Donnellan, Pat Donnellan and future Galway goalkeeper Gay Mitchell. 

Leydon retired from inter-county football in 1972 when his job with Cantrell and Cochrane required him to move to Cork. He joined Nemo Rangers and once again enjoyed success winning Cork Senior Football Championship and Munster titles in 1974 and 1975.

Awards
Leydon was selected on the Cu Chullain teams of 1965 and 1966. When the first All-Star team was picked in 1971, Leydon was selected in the corner-forward position. 
In 1999, Leydon was voted onto the Galway Team of the Millennium, a fitting reflection on one of the finest forwards ever to wear the maroon jersey.

Honours

St Jarleth's College
Hogan Cup:
Winner (1):1960

Dunmore
Galway Senior Football Championship:
Winner (5):1961, 1963, 1966, 1968, 1969
Connacht Senior Club Football Championship:
Winner (1):1966

Nemo Rangers
Cork Senior Football Championship:
Winner (2):1974, 1975

Galway
All-Ireland Senior Football Championship:
Winner (3): 1964, 1965, 1966
Runner-up (2): 1963, 1971
Connacht Senior Football Championship:
Winner (7): 1963, 1964, 1965, 1966, 1968, 1970, 1971
Runner-up (2): 1961, 1962
National Football League:
Winner (1): 1964–65
Runner-up (1): 1965-66
All-Ireland Minor Football Championship:
Winner (1): 1960

Connacht
Railway Cup:
Winner (2): 1967, 1969

Individual
All Star (1): 1971

References

External links
Dublin win cup, newsreel, 1963

1942 births
Living people
All Stars Awards winners (football)
Dunmore McHales Gaelic footballers
Galway inter-county Gaelic footballers
Nemo Rangers Gaelic footballers
People educated at St Jarlath's College